The 1999 Major League Baseball All-Star Game was the 70th playing of the midsummer classic between the all-stars of the American League (AL) and National League (NL), the two leagues comprising Major League Baseball. The game was held on July 13, 1999, at Fenway Park in Boston, Massachusetts, the home of the Boston Red Sox of the American League.

Fenway Park was chosen as host because the owners at the time were planning to build a New Fenway Park in a few years but were unable to get the project off the ground in time for the game.  The closing of Tiger Stadium in Detroit, Michigan, along with the move of the Milwaukee Brewers to the National League and the delay in the construction of Miller Park also played a role in the Red Sox being awarded the game.  

The pre-game ceremonies featured introductions of nominees for the All-Century Team, including longtime Red Sox outfielder Ted Williams.

In two innings, AL starting pitcher Pedro Martínez struck out the first four batters of the National League, becoming the first pitcher in history to begin the All-Star Game striking out the side. In all he struck out five of the six batters he faced, earning him Game MVP honors, becoming the second player in All-Star Game history to be named MVP as a member of the host team. The game resulted in a win for the American League by the final score of 4-1.
Starting with the 1999 All-Star Game, the games would always be held either on the 2nd or 3rd Tuesday of July, from 1999 to 2017, it was held between July 9 and July 16, and on July 17 in 2018.

Rosters
Players in italics have since been inducted into the National Baseball Hall of Fame.

National League

American League

Game

Umpires

This was the last All-Star Game with umpires from separate leagues. In 2000, Major League Baseball unified the umpiring staffs under its control. Five of the umpires in this game (Evans, Tata, Ford, Johnson, and Vanover) lost their jobs less than two months later as part of the 1999 Major League Umpires Association mass resignation. However, through an arbitration process, Vanover was rehired before the 2002 season.

Starting lineups

Game summary

Home Run Derby

 - eliminated in second round after hitting 13 HRs in the first round.

Notes
Both the American and National League Starting Pitchers would be on the Red Sox 2004 World Series Championship team.
Tampa Bay Slugger Jose Canseco was selected by the fans as the starting DH for the American League, his first selection in 7 years. By the All Star Break he was leading the AL with 31 Home Runs but he injured his back days prior to the game. He was replaced by Rafael Palmeiro. Canseco was also unable to participate in the Home Run Derby. 
After The Moffatts sang "O Canada" and (Boston native) Donna Summer sang "The Star-Spangled Banner", Hall of Famer Ted Williams threw out the first pitch of the All-Star Game. Before throwing the first pitch he was announced at Fenway as the greatest hitter of all time. The post-anthem flyover was by Fighter Squadron 31 from NAS Oceana, while Camp Edwards provided the colors presentation. The outfield flag presentation was by the Lowell Police Department and the Middlesex County Sheriff's Office.

References

External links

All-Star Game site
Lineups, boxscore, and more

Major League Baseball All-Star Game
Major League Baseball All-Star Game
Baseball competitions in Boston
Major League Baseball All-Star Game
Major League Baseball All-Star Game
Major League Baseball All-Star Game